Sean Murphy may refer to:

Sports
 Seán Óg Murphy (1897–1956), Irish hurler
 Seán Murphy (hurler) (born 1947), Irish hurler
 Seán Murphy (Gaelic footballer) (born 1932), Irish Gaelic football player
 Sean Murphy (boxer) (born 1964), English Commonwealth Games Gold-winning boxer
 Sean Murphy (swimmer) (born 1964), Canadian swimmer 
 Sean Murphy (golfer) (born 1965), American golfer 
 Sean Murphy (racing driver) (born 1984), in Auckland, New Zealand 
 Sean Murphy (baseball) (born 1994), American baseball player 
 Sean Murphy (rower) (born 1996), Australian rower

Other
 Sean Murphy (artist), American comic book creator
 Sean Murphy (cryptographer), professor at Royal Holloway, University of London
 Sean Murphy (journalist) (born 1958), Australian journalist
 Sean Murphy (photographer), American photographer
 Sean D. Murphy, professor at George Washington University
 Sean Murphy (Oz), a fictional character on the television series Oz

See also
Sean Murphy-Bunting, American football player
Shaun Murphy (disambiguation)
Shawn Murphy (disambiguation)